The Premi Sant Jordi de novel·la ("Saint George's novel prize") is an award for Catalan language literature, given by Òmnium Cultural and Enciclopèdia Catalana.

History

Francoism

This award was created in 1947 by the Catalan publisher Aymá. First named Premi Joanot Martorell in 1947, changed the name to Premi Sant Jordi de novel·la in 1960.

Democracy

The award is given yearly during the Nit literària de Santa Llúcia in December and has an endowment of 60,000 euros.

List of winners

Premi Joanot Martorell

Premi Sant Jordi

References

External links 
 Òmnium Cultural

Sant Jordi Novela
Awards established in 1947
1947 establishments in Spain